Sekinchan is a small town located in Sabak Bernam District, Selangor, Malaysia. It is located along the coastal Federal Route 5. 

Apart from being a lively fishing village, Sekinchan is one of the major rice producing areas of Malaysia. The vast, well-irrigated and organized paddy fields around Sekinchan produce one of the highest yields of rice in the country.

Sekinchan is often visited for its fresh seafood. It also draws diners from Kuala Lumpur and Ipoh. There are some rice millers in the area where locally produced rice can be purchased.

"The Seeds of Life", a local Chinese drama, is set there.

Sekinchan's first water park, MSekin Wonderland, was opened in 2021. The water park, which is not far from the beach, includes roughly ten different pools with slides, fountains, and other features such as trampolines, ATVs, and electric bikes. Hotel rooms and tents for rent are available for accommodation.

Etymology
It was thought that the name originally came from a corruption of "Second Chance" after the British pardoned the Communist. While the Chinese name of the town "适耕庄" translate to "suitable for planting" in English.

Geography
Sekinchan is located on the northwest Selangor plains, which stretched from Tanjung Karang all the way to Sabak Bernam and as well as the Straits of Malacca, allowing coastal access to the sea, making it a fishing village. Its location on the flat and uninterrupted plains allow it to be the "Rice bowl of Selangor."

{
  "type": "FeatureCollection",
  "features": []
}

Demographics

Most of Sekinchan's residents are Malays (47.5%), followed by Chinese (44.2%) and Indians (7.7%).

Education

Primary school
 Sekolah Kebangsaan Sungai Nibong
 Sekolah Kebangsaan Sungai Leman
 Sekolah Kebangsaan Seri Sekinchan
 Sekolah Kebangsaan Pasir Panjang
 Sekolah Kebangsaan Parit Empat
 Sekolah Kebangsaan Parit 9
 Sekolah Kebangsaan Parit 13
 Sekolah Kebangsaan Berjaya
 Sekolah Jenis Kebangsaan (Tamil) Ghandiji
 Sekolah Jenis Kebangsaan (Cina) Yoke Kuan
 Sekolah Jenis Kebangsaan (Cina) Kian Sit

Secondary school
 Sekolah Menengah Kebangsaan Dato Mustaffa
 Sekolah Menengah Jenis Kebangsaan Yoke Kuan

Economy
The economy in Sekinchan are mainly based on agriculture; Mainly around paddy, fishing and tourism.

Transportation
The town is served by Federal Route 5 Klang - Teluk Intan Highway, and for local bus route, it is served by MDSB SMART Selangor Bus

References

Sabak Bernam District
Towns in Selangor